Big City is the thirty third studio album by American country music artist Merle Haggard backed by The Strangers, released in 1981. It was his debut on the Epic label after ending his association with MCA. Big City peaked at number three on the Billboard Country Album charts and number 161 on the Pop Album charts. It was an RIAA-certified Gold album.

Background
After five years at MCA Records, Haggard jumped to Epic in 1982, and the move appeared to spark his creativity; he wrote or co-wrote eight of the LP's twelve tracks, including its two #1 singles, "Big City" and "My Favorite Memory." Haggard entered the studio with his band the Strangers and his mentor Lewis Talley and, in a two-day marathon recording session, produced enough songs for this release, plus Haggard’s 1982 LP, Going Where the Lonely Go. Many of the songs on Big City explore the struggle of the working man amid the complexities and challenges of urban life and aging.

The other single release, “Are the Good Times Really Over (I Wish a Buck Was Still Silver),” peaked at number two on the Billboard Hot Country Singles chart and also won the Academy of Country Music 1982 Song of the Year.

Big City also contains a rerecording of "You Don't Have Very Far to Go," which had originally appeared on Haggard's 1967 album Branded Man. "I Always Get Lucky With You" was later recorded by Haggard's friend George Jones for his 1983 album Shine On and became his last #1 single.

The CD reissue of Big City features two bonus tracks: "I Won't Give Up My Train," a duet with Roger Miller, and the uncredited "Call Me."

Reception

Thom Jurek of AllMusic believes the album "stands among his finest—and most lasting—recordings," adding, "Big City, both the cut and the album, revisits the seemingly eternal themes in Haggard's best work—the plight of the honest, decent working man amid the squalor, complication, and contradiction of urban life." Music critic Robert Christgau wrote "This isn't just for his cult—it's for the whole damn country audience... you can only tell how much filler there is by listening till you're sick of it."

Track listing
All tracks composed by Merle Haggard; except where indicated:

Personnel
Merle Haggard – vocals, guitar

The Strangers:
 Roy Nichols – guitar, harmonica
 Norm Hamlet – steel guitar, dobro
 Tiny Moore – fiddle, mandolin
 Bobby Wayne – rhythm guitar, backing vocals
 Mark Yeary – piano
 Jimmy Belken – fiddle
 Dennis Hromek – bass
 Biff Adam – drums
 Don Markham – trumpet, saxophone

with:
 Leona Williams – backing vocals

and:
 Slyde Hyde – trombone, euphonium

Production notes 
 Produced by Merle Haggard
 Engineered by Lewis Talley
 Mastered by Chris Athens
 Cover Photography by Norman Seeff

Charts

Weekly charts

Year-end charts

Singles

References 

1981 albums
Merle Haggard albums
Epic Records albums